Finn Alfred Hansen (born 9 October 1935) is a Danish footballer. He played in four matches for the Denmark national football team from 1957 to 1958.

References

External links
 

1935 births
Living people
Danish men's footballers
Denmark international footballers
Place of birth missing (living people)
Association footballers not categorized by position